The Beautiful Lie or A Beautiful Lie may refer to:

 A Beautiful Lie, a 2005 album by Thirty Seconds to Mars
 "A Beautiful Lie" (song), title track
 The Beautiful Lie (album), a 2006 album by Ed Harcourt
 The Beautiful Lie (TV series), an Australian drama miniseries
 The Beautiful Lie (film), a 1917 American silent film directed by John W. Noble
 The Beautiful Lie (2018 film), a 2018 Chinese children's film
 A Beautiful Lie, a 2013 album by Ever/After with drummer Jim Drnec
 The Beautiful Lie, a 2002 poetry collection by British writer Sheenagh Pugh
 The Beautiful Lie, a short film by Joshua Caldwell
 "The Beautiful Lie", a song on Dolly Parton's 2001 album Little Sparrow
 "The Beautiful Lie", a song on Alyth's 2009 album People Like Me
 "The Beautiful Lie", a 2009 song included with the song "Can You Hear Me?" by Evermore
 The Beautiful Lie, a 2016 EP by Stepson

See also 
 The Most Beautiful Lie, a 2009 album by Swedish performer Sebastian Karlsson
 Beautiful Lies (disambiguation)